Mount Pleasant Football Academy is a Jamaican professional football club based in the parish of Saint Ann. The club currently plays in the Red Stripe Premier League.

History
Formed in 2016 by Peter Gould, Mount Pleasant Football Academy, formerly known as “Stush in the Bush”, is nestled in the hills of St Ann, less than five minutes from the Runaway Bay main road, and has brought back football hype to the parish for the first time since Benfica FC participated in the 2010/2011 season.

The club gained promotion for the first time to the Red Stripe Premier League via the playoffs on July 1, 2018 by finishing second in the four team table.

Players

Current squad

References

Football clubs in Jamaica